The 1960 Argentine Grand Prix was a Formula One motor race held at Buenos Aires on 7 February 1960. It was race 1 of 10 in the 1960 World Championship of Drivers and race 1 of 9 in the 1960 International Cup for Formula One Manufacturers. This was the last Argentine Grand Prix until 1972, and the last to be held on the No. 4 configuration of the circuit.

The race was won by Bruce McLaren, his second consecutive victory, having won his first at Sebring at the end of the 1959 season. Stirling Moss suffered a suspension failure while leading, and took over Maurice Trintignant's Cooper, but was not awarded points for third place as a result of the shared drive, a rule that had been in place since 1958.

Venezuelan driver Ettore Chimeri participated in his only grand prix. He was killed two weeks later driving a Ferrari 250 TR in Havana. He was the first driver from his country in Formula One, and the last until Johnny Cecotto in 1983. It was the only grand prix appearances for Antonio Creus, Alberto Rodriguez Larreta and Roberto Bonomi. It was also the last grand prix appearances for the driver who scored Ferrari's first World Championship race victory, José Froilán González, and experienced American driver Harry Schell, who would be killed during practice for a non-championship race at Silverstone.

Three other local drivers took part in the practice sessions for the race. The Scuderia Centro Sud Maserati (№ 10) was driven in the first practice session by Pedro Llano, as well as by eventual race driver Nasif Estéfano and Rodriguez Larreta. In the second practice session, Julio Pola shared Chimeri's № 44 Maserati. Also, Oscar Cabalén shared Estéfano's car in the qualifying session as a reserve driver.

Classification

Qualifying

Race 

Notes
 – Trintignant and Moss received no points for the shared drive

Championship standings after the race

Drivers' Championship standings

Constructors' Championship standings

 Notes: Only the top five positions are included for both sets of standings.

References

Argentine Grand Prix
Argentine Grand Prix
Argentine Grand Prix
Argentine Grand Prix